Sudebnik of Tsar Ivan IV was an expansion and revision of the Sudebnik of 1497, a code of laws instituted by Ivan the Great, his grandfather.  It is considered the result of the first Russian parliament of feudal Estates (Zemsky Sobor).

The Sudebnik of 1550 liquidated the aristocracy's judicial privileges and strengthened the role of state judicial bodies.

The Sudebnik also provided for the active participation of the elective representatives of local communities (rural heads, jurymen, tselovalniki, dvorskie etc.) in legal proceedings.  The arrest of suspects could be made only at the consent of the local community. The representative of a community (dyak) participated in judicial office-work.  Town and rural communities had the right to self-management and the distribution of taxes. The Sudebnik confirmed the right of peasants to leave their feudal lords. The law precisely defined that the peasant had the right to leave the landowner after the payment of two fixed fees (a "break-away" fee called pozhiloye and a transportation fee called povoz).

Sources 

 
 Беляев И.Д. Крестьяне на Руси. Исследование о постепенном изменении значения крестьян в русском обществе. М. 1891 Типография Общества распространения полезных книг
 Monuments of Imperial Russian Law: Medieval Origins

1550 in law
1550s in Russia
Legal history of Russia
Medieval legal codes